Taygetina is a monotypic butterfly genus of the subfamily Satyrinae in the family Nymphalidae. The species in Coeruleotaygetis have been included in Taygetina. Its one species, Taygetina banghaasi, is found in the Neotropical realm.

References

Euptychiina
Monotypic butterfly genera
Taxa named by Walter Forster (entomologist)
Taxa named by Gustav Weymer